John Francis "Jack" Mulhern (born July 18, 1927, in Boston, Massachusetts - d. September 19, 2007 in Charlestown, Massachusetts) was an American ice hockey player. He won a silver medal at the 1952 Winter Olympics.

Awards and honors

References 

1927 births
2007 deaths
American men's ice hockey players
Ice hockey people from Boston
Ice hockey players at the 1952 Winter Olympics
Olympic silver medalists for the United States in ice hockey
NCAA men's ice hockey national champions
Medalists at the 1952 Winter Olympics